Hellmich is a surname. Notable people with the surname include:

Heinz Hellmich (1890–1944), German general in the Wehrmacht during World War II
Ottó Hellmich (1874–1937), Hungarian gymnast
Wolfgang Hellmich (born 1958), German politician